Gelato Italia is a British company producing high-end Italian frozen desserts. Their factory is based in Southend-on-Sea, Essex.  Gelato Italia operate nationally in the UK with ice cream vans, kiosks and parlours;

Founded in 2011, the company started producing gelato.

Products 

Gelato Italia produces over thirty different flavours of gelato, made of milk, water and a little cream only.
Gelato Italia produces gelato, ice cream, sorbet, granita slush ice, and frozen yogurt.
The company sells nationally to wholesalers, restaurants, grocery stores and ice cream parlours.

References 

Dairy products companies of the United Kingdom
Ice cream brands
Companies based in Essex
Food and drink companies established in 2011